1 E3 may refer to:
1000 (number), the natural number following 999 and preceding 1001
The chess opening move 1.e3, Van 't Kruijs Opening